GFC may refer to:

Sport 
 Global Fighting Championship, a defunct UAE-based kickboxing and mixed martial arts event
 Golden Fighter Championship, a Romania-based kickboxing promotion
 Gorilla FC, a fan club of the Seattle Sounders FC
 Groupama–FDJ, a French cycling team, has the UCI code GFC

Football clubs 
 Gillingham FC, Kent, England
 Garhwal F.C., New Delhi, India
 Global F.C., Cebu City, Philippines
 Guarani FC, Campinas, São Paulo, Brazil
 Guernsey F.C., Channel Islands
 Gyeongnam FC, Changwon, South Korea
 Geelong Football Club, Geelong, Australia

Other uses 
 GEROVA Financial Group
 Girls For A Change
 Global Financial Crisis
 Global Forest Coalition
 The Global Fund for Children
 Grand Forks Central High School, in North Dakota, United States
 Green Fiscal Commission, in the United Kingdom
 Guilt-free consumption
 "GfC", a 2008 single from the album ¿Cómo Te Llama? by Albert Hammond Jr.
 Generic flow control, part of an Asynchronous Transfer Mode cell
 Groupes Franc Motorisé de Cavalerie, a type of unit in the French Army during World War II